Maiestas hospes is a species of bug in the family Cicadellidae that can be found in Fiji, Hawaii, New Zealand.

Description
The species have brown markings on the tegmen with each cell has a dark brown outline. The colouration, is reliable and variable, determinations of which require examination of the male genitalia. It was formerly placed within Recilia, but a 2009 revision moved it to Maiestas.

References

Endemic fauna of Fiji
Insects described in 1904
Maiestas
Taxa named by George Willis Kirkaldy
Insects of Fiji